Tasiilap Karra or Cape Gustav Holm is a headland in eastern Greenland, Sermersooq municipality.

It was named after officer of the Danish Navy and Arctic explorer Gustav Holm (1849 – 1940).

Geography
Cape Gustav Holm is located near the Arctic Circle on the shores of the Denmark Strait coast of the North Atlantic Ocean, northeast of Tasiilaq.

This cape is the southern end of a narrow mountainous peninsula east of the Ikersuak Fjord which extends in a NE/SW direction, rising to a height of 966 m. The islet of Nanertalik lies 1.2 km off a small projection on the shore 5 km northeast of the cape and Cape Buchholz is located a further 7 km to the northeast along the coast.  The Northern K.J.V. Steenstrup Glacier has its terminus west of the cape.

References

External links
The Kap Gustav Holm Tertiary Plutonic Centre - GeoScienceWorld
 Cape Nansen, Greenland

Gustav Holm